Nri is an Igbo city-state in Anambra State, Nigeria. It was the seat of a powerful and imperial state who was influenced much by the territories inhabited by the Igbo of Awka and Onitsha to the east; the Efik, the Ibibio, to the south; Nsukka and Asaba, and the Anioma to the west. Today, Nri claims to be the heart and origin of the Igbos, but it is historically dated that Igbo Ukwu, formally known as Igbo, and Igbo Nkwo is the true origin and beginning of the Igbos.

History 

The Nri clan existed from as far back as the 9th century. Nri (the founder of Nri clan) and Aguleri were two of the sons of Eri (founder of Aguleri) and had migrated to the present day Nri from the Anambra (Omambala) river valley (Eriaka) in Aguleri in Northern Igboland. Nri was said to have inherited spiritual powers from his father. The Nri people belong to the Umueri clans who trace their origins to Eri.

Mythological Origin 
In the Nri mythology, Nri sent by Chukwu to make peace (settle disputes and cleanse abominations) and provide Igbo people food (yam and cocoyam).

Sources 
Elizabeth Isichei, African before 1800 (London: Longman, 1984).
Elizabeth Isichei, A History of the Igbo People (New York: Palgrave Macmillan, 1976).
Chikodi Anunobi, Nri Warriors of Peace (Zenith Publishers, January 2006)
https://books.google.com/books?id=3C2tzBSAp3MC&pg=PA246&lpg=PA246&dq=nri+igbo+ukwu&source=web&ots=1gvnMpIuM-&sig=Femk-UEgQw2M_soZUAU3ZZ4GEv8

http://essays.igbonet.com/EzeNriNriEnwelanaIIObidiegwuOnyeso/1005thIguAroNdIgbo/

http://www.chikodianunobi.com/pages/PressRoom/Conversation_w_Cyril.htm
http://www.kwenu.com/publications/anunobi/leadership_crises1.htm
http://www.nrienweluana.com

 
History of Nigeria